Tanju Miah is a 2006 British short documentary film directed and written by Sadik Ahmed. The film is about the eponymous Tanju Miah who after the disappearance of his mother is forced to fend for himself while waiting for her to return.

Summary
The documentary follows the day-to-day life of a boy growing up in rural Bangladesh. Seven-year-old Tanju Miah has been forced to fend for himself after his mother abandoned him – apparently, she was badly shaken up after getting beaten by her husband. Miah works to earn a living while waiting for the day that his mother returns.

In a roadside café, Miah clears off tables and mops the floor. He dreams of one day becoming very rich by begging of someday becoming a famous singer, so his mother could hear his song.

Production
Sadik Ahmed found Tanju's story while working on another documentary project in Bengal. The film was funded by the National Lottery.

Release
Tanju Miah received its North American premiere at the Toronto International Film Festival in September 2006. It was also screened at the 2006 Sundance Film Festival and the International Documentary Film Festival Amsterdam. The film was also screened for two months at the Curzon Cinemas in 2007.

Reception
Mark Dening of The New York Times said of Tanju Miah, "the uncharitable realities of his existence are never far away as he struggles to hold on to his hope and his dignity in the face of long odds." British Council Film said, "Director Sadik Ahmed uses a series of graceful scenes to build a psychologically complex portrait of a child who might otherwise disappear into statistics."

The Last Thakur
In Sadik's following film The Last Thakur, Tanju Miah, narrated and played the role of the young orphan Waris who earns a living serving in a tea hut.

Awards and nominations

References

External links

2006 films
2006 short documentary films
British Bangladeshi films
British short documentary films
Bangladeshi coming-of-age films
Bengali-language Bangladeshi films
British independent films
2000s Bengali-language films
Films shot in Bangladesh
Films directed by Sadik Ahmed
2006 independent films
2000s British films

bn:তানজু মিয়া